Although the general English usage of the adjective constructive is "helping to develop or improve something; helpful to someone, instead of upsetting and negative," as in the phrase "constructive criticism," in legal writing constructive has a different meaning.

Description
In its usage in law, constructive means what the law considers something to be, irrespective of the intentions of the relevant actor and irrespective of actual facts. It has also been defined in these terms: "That which exists, not in fact, but as a result of the operation of law. That which takes on a character as a consequence of the way it is treated by a rule or policy of law, as opposed to its actual character."

For example:

 "Constructive notice" refers to a judicial presumption that a person knows of some fact, because certain acts such as registration with a public agency have occurred, even though the person is actually ignorant of the fact.
 "Constructive knowledge" is knowledge that courts impute to a person because  such knowledge is obtainable by the exercise of reasonable care.
 "Constructive eviction" occurs when a landlord does not actually evict but does something that renders the premises unlivable. This might occur, for example, where a tenant vacates an apartment because a landlord turns off the heat or water. The tenant, however, must abandon possession in order to claim that there was a constructive eviction. 
 "Constructive fraud," unlike actual fraud which requires an intentional false statement, requires only a negligent false statement that causes damage to the plaintiff (or in some states an innocent but injurious false statement).

References

American legal terminology